Rafael Rosell IV (born November 10, 1982) is a Filipino actor and model.

Early life
Rafael Rosell IV was born in Stavanger, Norway on November 10, 1982 to Filipino parents; his father, Rafael Rosell III, is a geologist from Cebu, and his mother, Amelia Quimpo, is a nurse from Bicol. He was raised in Norway, while his grandfather, Rafael Rosell Jr., and his great-grandfather, Rafael Rosell Sr., were both raised in Cebu. Rosell has two siblings and he is the eldest amongst them.

Career

2000–2012: Career in ABS-CBN
During a vacation with his family in 2000, Rosell's mother found out about the auditions at ABS-CBN. He auditioned and got a TV commercial job for Close-Up toothpaste and signed a contract with Star Magic later that year.

In 2002, Rosell was introduced as one of the leading men of Jolina Magdangal, in Star Cinema's Kung Ikaw ay Isang Panaginip. His big break came in 2004 when he was paired with Claudine Barretto on the ABS-CBN fantaserye Marina. In 2006, he was launched as a member of the all-male group Coverboys with Zanjoe Marudo, Jon Avila, Victor Basa, and Jake Cuenca.

In 2007, Rosell won the Best Supporting Actor Award at the 30th Gawad Urian Awards for his work in the indie film Rome & Juliet.

He was a part of projects including Rounin, Prinsesa ng Banyera and Maligno. He starred in Status: Single under Viva Films.

Rosell started getting recognition in 2010 when he played Brandon Brazil in the ABS-CBN afternoon drama Midnight Phantom opposite his close friend Denise Laurel. After the success of Midnight Phantom and his team-up with Laurel, ABS-CBN paired them up again in Kristine. The team-up came to an abrupt end when Laurel took a one-year hiatus due to pregnancy, leaving Rosell to be paired up with Jodi Sta. Maria in 100 Days to Heaven.

2012–2019: Dahil sa Pag-ibig and transfer to GMA Network
In 2012, Rosell was reunited with Laurel in another ABS-CBN drama, Dahil sa Pag-ibig.

In August 2012 his contract with Star Magic expired, and he moved to GMA Network. He starred in Temptation of Wife with Marian Rivera.

2019–2021: Return to ABS-CBN
Rosell returned to ABS-CBN after seven years with GMA Network. His resurgence in the said network was in  an Ipaglaban Mo! episode.

2021–present: Return to GMA
Rafael returns to Kapuso Network after 2 years for his comeback teleserye, "To Have & To Hold".

Personal life
In 2009, Rosell confirmed that he and girlfriend Malaya Lewandowski had broken up after being together for three years.

Filmography

Film

Television

Awards and nominations

Notes

References

External links
 Official website 
 
 
 Rafael Rosell on YouTube
 

1982 births
Living people
Actors from Stavanger
21st-century Filipino male actors
Filipino male child actors
Filipino male film actors
Filipino male television actors
Filipino people of Catalan descent
Filipino male models
Star Magic
ABS-CBN personalities
GMA Network personalities